Horace William Chapman (30 June 1890 – 1 December 1941) was a South African cricketer who played in two Test matches from 1914 to 1921.

References

1890 births
1941 deaths
South Africa Test cricketers
South African cricketers